Haifa Bay central bus station (Merkazit HaMifratz, Arabic: مركزيّة هامفراتس (شاطئ حيفا) , Mirakazeat Hamifrats), known also as HaMifratz central bus station is the main bus station of the Haifa Bay (Mifratz Haifa) area. It is co-located with HaMifratz Central railway station and is adjacent to Lev HaMifratz Mall. It opened in 2002 and was substantially renovated and expanded in the late 2010s.

Overview 
HaMifratz central bus station serves local Egged bus lines within the city of Haifa, suburban lines, and the Metronit BRT system. Egged, Nateev Express and Superbus all operate intercity bus routes. All bus routes from the north and the Galilee which formerly terminated at the old Bat Galim central bus station now terminate at HaMifratz station.

The station is part of a large public transport complex at Lev Hamifratz which serves bus and rail passengers. The station also serves as a terminal for the Rakavlit, a 4.5 km-long aerial tramway connecting the station with the Technion University and other destinations located on Mount Carmel which opened in 2022. The complex will also serve as a terminal for the future Haifa–Nazareth tram-train line which is under construction as of 2022.

Rebuilding of the station began in mid 2015 and was finished in October 2019.

Bus routes 
The bus routes originating or passing at HaMifratz bus station as of January 2022 are listed below.

Metronit BRT

Local routes

Intercity routes

References

External links 
 Haifa Metropolitan Transport
 Superbus
 Egged
 Nativ Express (Hebrew only)

Bus stations in Haifa
Lev HaMifratz